Thy Neighbor's Wife is a 1953 American drama film written, produced and directed by Hugo Haas and starring Cleo Moore, Hugo Haas, Ken Carlton, Kathleen Hughes, Anthony Jochim and Tom Fadden. It was released on September 11, 1953, by 20th Century Fox.

Plot

Cast     
Cleo Moore as Lita Vojnar
Hugo Haas as Town Judge Raphael Vojnar
Ken Carlton as Quirin Michael
Kathleen Hughes as Anushka
Anthony Jochim as Sima 
Tom Fadden as Honza Kratky
Darr Smith
Oscar O'Shea 		
Tom Wilson		
Roy Engel 
Robert Knapp
Joe Duval 		
Henry Corden

Release
The film opened in 4 theatres in Los Angeles on September 11, 1953 on a double bill with City of Bad Men grossing $17,000 in its first week.

References

External links
 
 

1953 films
American drama films
1953 drama films
20th Century Fox films
Films directed by Hugo Haas
American black-and-white films
1950s English-language films
1950s American films